The 1984 Gold Eagle Beer season was the 10th season of the franchise in the Philippine Basketball Association (PBA).

Transactions

Occurrences
In the third and last playing date of the quarterfinal round on June 17, the Beermen and the Gilbey's Gin Tonics battled for the last seat in the round of four semifinals, Gilbey's won, 106–104, but the match was put under protest by Gold Eagle, citing a malfunctioning 25-second shot clock and the PBA technical committee, acting on the protest have ordered a replay. Two nights later on June 19, Gilbey's Gin left no doubt as to their rightful claim to the semifinal round by winning the replayed game over the Beermen by nine points, 115–106.

After Crispa release their import Herman Barnes, who played only one game for the Redmanizers, the Gold Eagle Beermen signed him up but sooner decided to replaced Barnes in favor of Floyd Hooper.

Won-loss records vs Opponents

Roster

Additions

References

San Miguel Beermen seasons
Gold